The Icelandic Sailing Association is the national governing body for the sports of sailing, rowing, canoeing, and kayaking in Iceland.

References

External links
 Official website

Iceland
Sailing
Sailing in Iceland
1973 establishments in Iceland